Dharmapuri Assembly constituency of Telangana Legislative Assembly, India. It is one among 3 constituencies in Jagitial district. It is part of Peddapalle Lok Sabha constituency.

Koppula Eshwar of Telangana Rashtra Samithi is representing the constituency since its inception in 2009.

Mandals
The Assembly Constituency presently comprises the following Mandals:

Members of Legislative Assembly

Election results

2018

2014

Andhra Pradesh

2009

See also
 List of constituencies of Telangana Legislative Assembly

References

Assembly constituencies of Telangana
Jagtial district